The Constitution of Barbados is the supreme law under which Barbados is governed. The Constitution provides a legal establishment of the Government of Barbados, as well as legal rights and responsibilities of the public and various other government officers.  The Constitution which came into force in 1966 was amended in 1974, 1978, 1990, 1992, 1995, 2002, 2003, and 2021. The 1966 document succeeds several other documents concerning administration of Barbados. One of them, the Barbados Charter, is discussed in the present Constitution's Preamble. Prior statutes were created for the administration of Barbados as a colony.  As a former English and later British colony, the Constitution is similar to those of other former Commonwealth realms, yet distinctly different in the spirit of the Statute of Westminster.

History

Early history
In 1625 the English landed at Barbados and carved the term 'For King James of E. and this island' on a tree, then some personal items were left behind, and the ship's crew returned to England to notify The Crown and to seek initial settlers. In 1627 the initial settlers landed at Barbados and formed a colony based entirely on common law. As the population of Barbados grew a General Assembly was created and began to draft laws.  After conflict in England erupted during the English Civil War, and large numbers of English settlers moved to Barbados, the General Assembly began the practice of creating a distinctly Barbados-based administration based upon the plantocracy class.

Recent history
As a constituent province of the West Indies Federation, Barbados became independent of the United Kingdom on 30 November 1966 under the Barbados Independence Act 1966. Elizabeth II issued an Order in Council, the Barbados Independence Order 1966, which formally enacted the present constitution.  On 30 November 2021, Sandra Mason became the first President of Barbados, replacing Queen Elizabeth as head of state, with Barbados transitioning to a republic.

Amendments 
The Constitution may be amended by Act of Parliament.  Amendments to certain defined clauses require the support of two thirds of all the members of each House.

Some amendments 
 Barbados Independence Act 1966 (Cap. 37).
 Constitutional law 1966/Nov/17 - Includes the Barbados Independence Order, 1966 which establishes the judiciary, judicial procedures and parliament. The Constitution is included in the Schedule to the Order.
Chapter 1 stipulates that the Constitution is the supreme law
Chapter 2 Citizenship
Chapter 3 Protection of fundamental rights and freedoms of the individual
Chapter 4 The Governor-General
Chapter 5 Parliament
Chapter 6 Executive powers
Chapter 7 The judicature
Chapter 8 The public service
Chapter 9 Finance
Chapter 10 Miscellaneous and interpretation
 Barbados Independence Order 1966 (No. 1455). - 1966/Nov/22 (Date of entry into force: 1966-11-30)
 Barbados Constitution (First Amendment) Act (L.R.O. 1978). - Amends a large number of sections in the Constitution including: sections 3, 6, 7, 13, 22, 27, 37, 38, 39, 43, 44, 45, 79, 81, 82, 84, 89, 94, 95, 96, 97, 99, 100, 104, 105, 106, 112, 113, 117. In addition, the following new sections are inserted into the Constitution: 79A, 89A, 93A and 93B and 100A.
 Barbados Constitution (Second Amendment) Act, 1990. - Amendments relating primarily to the office of Judges.
 Barbados Constitution (Third Amendment) Act, 1992.
 Barbados Constitution (Fourth Amendment) Act, 1995 (No. 2 of 1995) - Inserts a new section 112A on remuneration of public officers and soldiers which provides that the salaries and allowances payable to the holders of offices established under the Civil Establishment Act and the Defence Act shall not be altered to their disadvantage.
 Barbados Constitution (Fifth Amendment) Act, 2002 (No. 14). - Amends Sections 15, 23 and 78 of Constitution. Establishes that imposition of mandatory sentence of death or execution thereof shall not be inconsistent with Section 15 of Constitution. Also provides for transfer between Barbados and other countries of persons detained in prisons, hospitals or other institutions by virtue of orders made in the course of the exercise by courts or tribunals of their jurisdiction.
 Barbados Constitution (Sixth Amendment) Act, 2003 (2003–10). - Amends Constitution of Barbados. Inter alia provides for establishment, composition and jurisdiction of Caribbean Court of Justice.
 Constitution (Amendment) (No. 2) Act, 2021. Introduced the office of President of Barbados, to replace the role of Elizabeth II, Queen of Barbados.

Structure 
 CONSTITUTIONAL ORDER

The Constitution of Barbados, is divided into a preamble, 10 parts and four schedules. They are set out as below.

Preamble 
According to the Constitution:
 Whereas the love of free institutions and of independence has always strongly characterised the inhabitants of Barbados: And Whereas the Governor and the said inhabitants settled a Parliament in the year 1639:
 And Whereas as early as 18 February 1651 those inhabitants, in their determination to safeguard the freedom, safety and well-being of the Island, declared, through their Governor, Lords of the Council and members of the Assembly, their independence of the Commonwealth of England:
 And Whereas the rights and privileges of the said inhabitants were confirmed by articles of agreement, commonly known as the Charter of Barbados, had, made and concluded on 11 January 1652 by and between the Commissioners of the Right Honourable the Lord Willoughby of Parham, Governor, of the one part, and the Commissioners on behalf of the Commonwealth of England, of the other part, in order to the rendition to the Commonwealth of England of the said Island of Barbados:
 And Whereas with the broadening down of freedom the people of Barbados have ever since then not only successfully resisted any attempt to impugn or diminish those rights and privileges so confirmed, but have consistently enlarged and extended them:

Now, therefore, the people of Barbados:
 § a. proclaim that they are a sovereign nation founded upon principles that acknowledge the supremacy of God, the dignity of the human person, their unshakeable faith in fundamental human rights and freedoms and the position of the family in a society of free men and free institutions;
 § b. affirm their belief that men and institutions remain free only when freedom is founded upon respect for moral and spiritual values and the rule of law;
 § c. declare their intention to establish and maintain a society in which all persons may, to the full extent of their capacity, play a due part in the institutions of the national life;
 § d. resolve that the operation of the economic system shall promote the general welfare by the equitable distribution of the material resources of the community, by the human conditions under which all men shall labour and by the undeviating recognition of ability, integrity and merit;
 § e. desire that the following provisions shall have effect as the Constitution of Barbados—

Chapter 1: The Constitution 
 Section 1
 §1. ##*This Constitution is the supreme law of Barbados and, subject to the provisions of this Constitution, if any other law is inconsistent with this Constitution, this Constitution shall prevail and the other law shall, to the extent of the inconsistency, be void.

Chapter 2: Citizenship 
Comprises sections 2-10.
 Becoming a citizen on Independence day (30 November). Born in Barbados on or after. Born outside Barbados on or after. Registration. Dual nationality. Legislation. Interpretation.
Persons who become citizens on 30 November 1966
Person entitled to be registered as citizens
Persons born in Barbados after 29 November 1966
Persons born outside Barbados after 29 November 1966
Marriage to citizen of Barbados
Renunciation of citizenship
Commonwealth citizens
Powers of Parliament
Interpretation

Chapter 3: Protection of Fundamental Rights and Freedoms of the Individual 
Comprises sections 11-27. (Based upon European Convention on Human Rights)
 Fundamental rights and freedoms; rights to life, personal liberty, law, inhuman treatment, slavery and forced labour, arbitrary search and entry; freedom of movement, conscience, expression, assembly and association; privacy, work, racial discrimination, deprivation of property. Provisions for public emergencies, protection of detained persons under emergency laws. Enforcement. Existing laws. Interpretation and savings.
Fundamental rights and freedoms of the individual
Protection of right to life
Protection of right to personal liberty
Protection of freedom of expression
Protection of freedom of assembly and association
Protection of freedom of movement
Protection from discrimination on grounds of race, etc.
Enforcement of protective provisions
Time of emergency
Saving of existing law
Interpretation

Chapter 4: The President 
Comprises sections 28-34H.
 Establishment. Election and impeachment procedures. Acting President. Oath. Exercise. Information on matters of government.
Office of President and Head of State
Qualification
Disqualifications
Determination of certain questions
Election of President
Acting President
Term of office
Conditions of office
Vacation of office
Removal from office
Procedure for removal from office
Oath
Personal staff of President
Exercise of President's functions
Immunities of President

Chapter 5: Parliament 
Largest chapter, covering sections 35-62.

PART 1: Composition of Parliament 
Comprises sections 35-47.
 Establishment, House of Assembly, Senate, Clerks to Houses.
Establishment of Parliament
Senate
Qualifications for membership of Senate
Disqualifications for membership of Senate
Tenure of seats of Senators
President and Deputy President of Senate
House of Assembly
Electoral law
Qualifications for membership of the Assembly
Disqualifications for membership of the Assembly
Tenure of seats of members of Assembly
Determination of questions of membership of Senate and Assembly
Filling of Casual Vacancies in Senate and Assembly

PART 2: Powers and Procedure of Parliament 
Comprises sections 48-59.
 Legislative power and alteration of Constitution, Procedure and Oath, Voting, Bills and Quorums.
Power to make laws
Alteration of this Constitution
Regulation or procedure in Parliament
Presiding in Senate
Quorum of Senate
Voting in Senate
Introduction of Bills, etc.
Restriction on powers of Senate as to Money Bills
Restrictions on powers of Senate as to Bills other than Money Bills
Provisions relating to section 54, 55 and 56
Assent to Bills
Oath of allegiance
Session of Parliament

PART 3: Summoning, Prorogation and Dissolution 
Comprises sections 60-62.
 Prorogation and Dissolution, General Elections, Electoral and Boundaries Commission, electoral divisions.
Prorogation and Dissolution of Parliament
General Election and Appointment of Senators

Chapter 6: The Executive Powers 
Sections 63-79(A).
 Executive authority. Prime Minister, Performance of functions during absence or illness. Ministers of Government and portfolio allocation. Attorney General. Performance of ministerial functions. Cabinet. Ministers of State. Oath taken by Ministers, etc. Leader of the Opposition. Permanent Secretaries and Cabinet Secretary. Control of public prosecutions. Constitution of offices, etc. Prerogative of mercy. Procedure in capital cases. Barbados Privy Council.
Executive authority of Barbados
Cabinet
Appointment of Ministers
Tenure of office of Ministers
Performance of Prime Minister's functions in certain events
Temporary Ministers
Oaths to be taken by Ministers
Presiding in Cabinet
Governor General to be informed concerning matters of government
Assignment of responsibilities to Ministers
Parliamentary Secretaries
Leader of the Opposition
Certain vacancies in office of Leader of Opposition
Privy Council
Proceedings of Privy Council
Prerogative of Mercy
Establishment of office of Attorney-General and functions of Director of Public Prosecutions

Chapter 7: The Judicature 
Comprises sections 79(B)-88.

PART 1: The Caribbean Court of Justice, the Supreme Court and the Magistrate’s Courts 
Sections 79(B)-84.
 Establishment of Supreme Court, Court of Appeal. Supreme Court. Court of Appeal. Originally, appeals to Her Majesty in Council; appeals to Privy Council since abolished by several Barbados Constitution Bills and replaced with the Caribbean Court of Justice.
Establishment of Supreme Court
Appointment of Judges
Acting Judges
Oaths to be taken by Judges
Tenure of office of Judges

PART 2: APPEALS 
Sections 85-88.
• Right to appeal judicial decisions, decisions of CCJ are final and cannot be appealed or enquiry in any tribunal or other court.

Chapter 8: The Public Service 
Comprises sections 89-106.

PART 1. THE SERVICES COMMISSIONS 
Sections 89-92(§3).
 Public Services Commission.
Establishment and composition of Judicial and legal Service Commission
Establishment and composition of Public Service Commission
Establishment and composition of Police Service Commission
Procedure of Commissions

PART 2. APPOINTMENT, REMOVAL AND DISCIPLINE OF PUBLIC OFFICERS 
Sections 93-102.
 Appointment of public officers and other civil servants.
Appointment, etc., of judicial and legal officers
Appointment, etc., of public officers
Delegation of powers under section 94
Appointment, etc., of members of the Police Force
Delegation of powers under section 96
Appeals to privy Council in disciplinary matters
Appointment of permanent secretaries and certain other public officers
Appointment, etc., of principal representatives abroad and subordinate staff
Appointment, etc., of Director of Public Prosecutions
Appointment, etc., of Auditor General

PART 3. PENSIONS 
Sections 103-104.
 Pensions. Gratuity and retirement
Protection of pension rights
Grant and withholding of pensions, etc.

PART 4. MISCELLANEOUS 
Sections 105-106.
 Discipline.
Removal from office of certain persons
Protection of Commissions, etc., from legal proceedings

Chapter 9: FINANCE 
Sections 107-113.
 Consolidated Revenue Fund, Contingencies Fund. Remuneration, public debt and audit.
Consolidated Fund
Estimate
Authorization of expenditure
Meeting expenditure from consolidated Fund
Public debt
Remuneration of Governor General and certain other officers
Establishment of office and functions of Auditor-General

Chapter 10: MISCELLANEOUS AND INTERPRETATION 
Sections 114-117.
 Code of Conduct. National Symbols. Appointments. Removal and Resignations. Consultation. National Seal. Interpretation.
Appointments
Resignations
Vacation of office on attaining a prescribed age
Interpretation

FIRST SCHEDULE - Oaths 
 Oath of Allegiance; Governor-General; Prime Minister/Minister/Parliamentary Secretary; Director of Public Prosecutions; Judicial Oath (Chief Justice/Justice of Appeal/Judge of the High Court); Judicial Oath for Judges of the Caribbean Court of Justice (President/Judge)

SECOND SCHEDULE - Provisions Relating to Certain Tribunals 
Sections 1-11.
 Tribunal vacancies, Records keeping, Brokering divided votes, rules creation and protection from liability, parity to Supreme Court, summons, disruption of proceedings, protection from self-incrimination

THIRD SCHEDULE - RULES RELATING TO THE CONSTITUENCIES 
Sections 1-2.
The electorate shall, so far as practicable, be equal in all constituencies: Provided that the electorate in any constituency shall, so far as practicable, not exceed 115%, nor be less than 85%, of the total electorate divided by the number of constituencies.
Natural boundaries such as highways and rivers shall be used wherever possible.

See also 
Magna Carta
Barbados and the Commonwealth of Nations
Constitution of the United Kingdom

References

Further reading 
 1966 Constitution rev. through 2007  —- Constitute Project
 1966 Constitution rev. through 2007  —- World Intellectual Property Office (WIPO)
 1966 Constitution rev. through 2000  —- ConstitutionNet
 1966 Constitution rev. through 2000  —- Georgetown University Political Database of the Americas

1966 in Barbados
1966 documents
1966 in law
Government of Barbados
Barbados
Law of Barbados